Long distance or Long-distance may refer to:

Long-distance calling
Long-distance operator
Long-distance relationship
Long-distance train
Long-distance anchor pylon, see dead-end tower

Footpaths 
Long-distance trail
European long-distance paths
Long Distance Routes, official term for footpaths in Scotland
List of long-distance footpaths
Long-distance footpaths in the United Kingdom
Long-distance trails in the United States
Long-distance trails in the Republic of Ireland

Arts and media
Long Distance (Ivy album), 2001
Long Distance (Runrig album), 1996
"Long Distance" (song), a 2008 song by Brandy Norwood
"Long Distance" (Melanie Amaro song), 2012
"Long Distance", by 8stops7 from the album Birth of a Cynic
Long Distance (film), a 1961 Australian television film
Long Distance, a 2015 IDW Publishing comics series

Sports 
Long-distance riding
Long-distance running
Long-distance swimming

See also 
"Long Distance Call", an episode of The Twilight Zone
Long Distance Calling (band), a German band
Long Distance Voyager, a 1981 album by Moodyblues
Middle distance (disambiguation)